White Hall is the name of some places in Virginia:

White Hall, Albemarle County, Virginia
White Hall, Frederick County, Virginia